Pavlo Dulzon (born 12 May 1995) is a Ukrainian footballer who plays as a striker.

Career

Early career
Born in Chernihiv, Dulzon started his career in the young academy of Yunist Chernihiv before moving to RVUFK Kyiv. In 2011 he moved to SDYuShOR Desna but returned to Yunist Chernihiv within a year.

Professional career
Dulzon began his professional career in 2012 with YSB Chernihiv and Avanhard Koryukivka. In 2016 he moved to FC Yednist' Plysky but quickly moved to Ternopil, where he played nine matches.  Later that same year, he moved to Viktoria Aschaffenburg in Germany, where he played 12 matches and scored 4 goals in Bayernliga Nord. In 2019 he returned to Koryukivka and then to Agrodim. In summer 2022 he moved to Albirex Niigata Barcelona.

Career statistics

Club

Honours
Viktoria Aschaffenburg
 Bayernliga Nord: 2018

Avanhard Koryukivka
 Chernihiv Oblast Football Championship: 2013
 Chernihiv Oblast Football Cup: 2013

YSB Chernihiv
 Chernihiv Oblast Football Cup: 2012

References

External links
 

1995 births
Living people
Ukrainian footballers
Footballers from Chernihiv
Association football forwards
FC Yunist Chernihiv players
SDYuShOR Desna players
Piddubny Olympic College alumni
FC Chernihiv players
FC Avanhard Koriukivka players
FC Ternopil players
FC Yednist Plysky players
Viktoria Aschaffenburg players
Expatriate footballers in Germany
Expatriate footballers in Spain
Ukrainian expatriate sportspeople in Germany
Ukrainian expatriate sportspeople in Spain
Bayernliga players
Ukrainian First League players
Ukrainian Amateur Football Championship players